Charles Edgar Samuel Montagu, 5th Baron Swaythling (born 20 February 1954), is the second child and only son of David Montagu, 4th Baron Swaythling, and Christiane Françoise Dreyfus. His two sisters are Fiona Yvonne Montagu (deceased) and the Hon. Nicole Mary Montagu.

Life
Educated at Milton Abbey, he married Hon Angela Rawlinson (daughter of Peter Rawlinson, Baron Rawlinson of Ewell) on 24 February 1996, becoming her second husband.

He succeeded his father to the title of Baron Swaythling on 1 July 1998.

Arms

References

External links
 geni.com

1954 births
Living people
Charles
Charles
People educated at Milton Abbey School
British Jews
Swaythling